Brajavali (Bengali:  Brôjobuli) was a literary language used by Sankardev (1449–1568) for some of his compositions (Borgeets and Ankia Naats) in the context of his Vaishnavite religion, Ekasarana Dharma, in Bengal. Though similar languages were used in the Vaishnavite contexts in Odisa, the one used in Bengal was different, as it was based on Maithili (and not Brajbhasa),  to which Bengali is added and the native pronunciation overrides the original pronunciation of Maithili. In general, the vocables and idiomatic expressions of Brajavali were local (Bengali), while the inflectional forms were Maithili, easily understood by the people of Bengali but carrying the flavor of Brajbhasa, the language of choice of the Bhakti poets.

See also
Brajabuli – another literary language based on Maithili

Notes

References

 

Languages of Assam